The SPAD XIV was a French biplane floatplane fighter aircraft built by Société Pour L'Aviation et ses Dérivés (SPAD) and flown by the French Navy during World War I.

Development and design
The SPAD XIV was a development of the SPAD XII. It was single-seat biplane powered by a 149 kW (200 hp) Hispano-Suiza 8Bc engine. 40 were constructed and flew in the French Navy during 1918.

Operators

Aeronavale

Specifications

References

 Taylor, John W. R., and Jean Alexander. "Combat Aircraft of the World" New York: G.P. Putnam's Sons, 1969 Library of Congress Catalog Card Number 68-25459 (Pg.128-129

1910s French fighter aircraft
S.XIV
Aircraft first flown in 1917
Biplanes
Single-engined tractor aircraft
Floatplanes